Soleymanabad may refer to:
Soleymanabad, Fars
Soleymanabad, Hamadan
Soleymanabad, Isfahan
Soleymanabad, Baraan-e Shomali, Isfahan Province
Soleymanabad, Kerman
Soleymanabad, Faryab, Kerman Province
Soleymanabad, Dalahu, Kermanshah Province
Soleymanabad, Kangavar, Kermanshah Province
Soleymanabad, Khuzestan
Soleymanabad, Mazandaran
Soleymanabad, North Khorasan
Soleymanabad, Buin Zahra, Qazvin Province
Soleymanabad, Qazvin
Soleymanabad, Tehran (disambiguation), several places
Soleymanabad, West Azerbaijan
Soleymanabad, Chaldoran, West Azerbaijan Province